Taiwanese literature refers to the literature written by Taiwanese in any language ever used in Taiwan, including Japanese, Taiwanese Han (Hokkien, Hakka and Mandarin) and Austronesian languages.

Novels, short stories, and poetry 
Taiwan has a very active literary scene, with a large number of writers of novels and (especially) short stories enjoying a wide readership, many of them for many decades running. A short selection of prominent writers and poets includes:

 Wu Zhuoliu (1900–1976)
 Bo Yang (1920-2008)
 Huang Chunming (1935-)
 Pai Hsien-yung (1937-)
 Chen Ruoxi (1938-)
 Wang Wenxing (1939-)
 Yang Mu (1940-)
 San Mao (1943-1991)
 Lung Ying-tai (1952-)
 Qiu Fengjia (1864–1912)
 Loa Ho (1894-1943)
 John Ching Hsiung Wu (1899-1986)
 Chou Meng-tieh (1921-2014)
 William Marr (1936-)
 Li Kuei-Hsien (1937-)
 Wai-lim Yip (1937-)
 Xi Murong (1943-)
 Yang-Min Lin (1955-)
 Luo Yijun (1967-)
 Hou Wen-yong (1962-)
 Li Bi-chhin (1979-)

See the full list of Taiwanese writers.

Similarly, there is a large poetry community in Taiwan, and there have been several anthologies of Taiwanese poetry in English translation.

Two areas of cross-pollination between literature and other arts in Taiwan include modern dance (particularly the modern dance troupe Cloud Gate Dance Theater, founded and directed by author Lin Huai-min) and filmmaking (including productions of stories by Huang Chunming directed by the leading Taiwanese filmmaker Hou Hsiao-hsien).

The 1990s saw the rise of a nativist Taiwan literature movement. 

More recently, Taiwan literature has also been included in Sinophone literature and world literature.

Literature relating to politics
With the establishment of the Communist regime in mainland China in 1949, books from mainland China were not often published in Taiwan and books from Taiwan were not often published in mainland China. In 1986, the first novel, Three Kings, written by a mainland Chinese writer, Ah Cheng, was openly published as such in Taiwan.

Some books from mainland China still found their way into Taiwan before 1986 by different ways. As pirate editions, under both a different title and a pseudonym for the author, under a different title, but with the author's name unchanged, under a pseudonym but with the title unchanged, or altered by changes in the text itself.

Popular kinds of books
Often books which have a movie based on them sell well in Taiwan. The Harry Potter series are popular and so is Bridget Jones's Diary. Some non-western popular books are The Hooligan Professor, 流氓教授, by Lin Jian-long 林建隆, and Big Hospital Small Doctor 大醫院小醫師, by Hou Wun-yong 侯文詠. Both were adapted for television. Other popular non-literary works included books on mastering English and attaining success.

Literary awards
The awards for Taiwanese literature include Taiwan Literature Award (presented by National Museum of Taiwan Literature), Wu San-Lien Literary Award (Wu San-Lien Award Foundation), Aboriginal Literature Award, and Min-Hakka Literary Award (both by the Ministry of Education of Taiwan).

Museums

 Lee Rong-chun Literary Museum
 Taichung Literature Museum
 Yang Kui Literature Memorial Museum
 Yeh Shih-tao Literature Memorial Hall
 Yilan Literary Museum

See also
 Taiwan nativist literature
 Culture of Taiwan 
 Chinese culture 
 List of Taiwanese writers
 National Museum of Taiwan Literature

References

External links
 Contemporary Authors Full-Text & Image System 當代文學史料影像全文系統  (in Chinese characters)
 Mimesis and Motivation in Taiwan Colonial Fiction
 National Museum of Taiwanese Literature
 On-line Alliance of Taiwan's Modern Poetry 臺灣現代詩網路聯盟 (in Chinese characters)
 Taiwan Fiction in Translation
 Taiwanese Literature (gio.gov.tw)
 Taiwan Literature - English Translation Series (journal)
 Taiwan Xiangtu (Hsiangtu) Wenxue (Taiwan Nativist Literature): the Sojourner-Narrator
UCSB Taiwanese Literature Database
honco newspaper
government website
taipetimes
"Four Taiwanese Writers on Themselves: Chu T’ien-wen, Su Wei Chen, Cheng Chiung-ming and Ye Lingfang respond to our questionnaire," French Centre for Research on Contemporary China, May / June 1998.